The 2014 Tampa Bay Buccaneers season was the franchise's 39th season in the National Football League. It was also the first season under head coach Lovie Smith, replacing Greg Schiano, who was fired at the end of the 2013 season. It was also the first season under general manager Jason Licht, following the departure of Mark Dominik, after a disappointing 2013 season. It also marked the first season under new ownership since 1994, after longtime owner Malcolm Glazer died on May 28, 2014. Glazer's sons took over team operations.

The Buccaneers tried to improve their record of 4–12 of last season, but failed after tying their number of losses when they lost to Carolina in Week 15. Following a 2–14 record, their worst since 1986, the Buccaneers finished last overall in the NFC and tied with the Titans for the worst record of the 2014 season, but was statistically (via a tiebreaker) last overall for the 2014 NFL season, thus earning the right to the first overall pick in the 2015 NFL Draft.
 The Bucs did not win a single home game in 2014, going 0-2 during the preseason and 0-8 in the regular season at Raymond James Stadium.

2014 draft class

Draft trades
 The Buccaneers traded their fourth-round selection (No. 104 overall) along with their 2013 first-round selection (13th overall) to the New York Jets in exchange for cornerback Darrelle Revis on April 21, 2013.
 The Buccaneers traded their seventh-round selection (No. 221 overall) and a 2015 fifth-round selection to the Buffalo Bills in exchange for the Bills' 2014 fifth-round selection (No. 149 overall).
 The Buccaneers traded their original sixth-round selection (No. 183 overall) to the Chicago Bears in exchange for offensive tackle Gabe Carimi on June 9, 2013. The Buccaneers later acquired a new sixth-round selection (No. 185 overall) in a trade that sent wide receiver Mike Williams to the Buffalo Bills on April 4, 2014.

Season summary

Offseason & preseason
Immediately after being named the new head coach, Lovie Smith began overhauling personnel. The primary goal was to reinstall the Tampa 2 defensive scheme that brought the club success during the late 1990s and early 2000s. Among the key cuts were Davin Joseph, and Darrelle Revis. Among the many new signings were quarterback Josh McCown, defensive end Michael Johnson and cornerback Alterraun Verner.

On August 26, the Buccaneers traded with New England for guard Logan Mankins. The Buccaneers finished the preseason only 1-3, but were still picked by some media members to be much-improved, and to even be a wild card contender.

September
The Buccaneers started the Lovie Smith Era off on a low note, losing on opening day to Carolina, then losing in the last minute to the Rams in week 2. In week three, the team was humiliated on a nationally-televised Thursday night game, 56-14 to division rival Atlanta. Smith stated afterwards he was "embarrassed" by the performance, and said the loss was so terrible to the team, that it would "leave a scar."

One week later, Mike Glennon started at quarterback, and Buccaneers bounced back in a big way. Tampa Bay defeated Pittsburgh, their first win of the season, with a last-second go-ahead touchdown pass.

October
Tampa Bay went winless in October, with Mike Glennon at quarterback. Two overtime losses, and one blowout loss to Baltimore dropped the Buccaneers to 1-6.

November
Mike Glennon was benched after losing to Cleveland, and Josh McCown was back in at quarterback. Tampa Bay managed to win against the Redskins, with help from a breakout game from Mike Evans. Despite only two wins, the Buccaneers were still mathematically alive for the division title through the end of November due to the lackluster records of the NFC South teams.

December
Tampa Bay ended the season on a six-game losing streak, going winless in December, to finish the season 2-14. In the final game of the season against New Orleans, the Buccaneers blew a lead in the fourth quarter, sitting some of their starters in the second half. But by virtue of the loss, the Buccaneers mathematically clinched the first pick in the 2015 NFL Draft, beating out the Tennessee Titans (who also went 2-14).

Staff

Final roster

Schedule

Preseason

Regular season

Game summaries

Week 1: vs. Carolina Panthers

The first game for new head coach Lovie Smith was against division rival Carolina. A lackluster first three quarters saw the Panthers run out to a 17–0 lead, with Derek Anderson making his first start since 2010 in place of an injured Cam Newton. In the fourth quarter, the Buccaneers rallied, scoring late two touchdowns, and trimming the lead to 17–14 with 2:06 remaining. The Bucs defense forced a 3 & Out, and Carolina punted, giving the ball back to the Bucs offense with just under two minutes to go. On the first play of the drive, however, Bobby Rainey's catch was fumbled away, and Carolina recovered.

Week 2: vs. St. Louis Rams

St. Louis kicker Greg Zuerlein kicked a 38-yard field goal with 42 seconds remaining to take a 19–17 lead. On the ensuing drive, Tampa Bay quarterback Josh McCown completed a 19-yard pass to Bobby Rainey, then spiked the ball to stop the clock with 20 second left in regulation. McCown completed a 29-yard pass to Mike Evans at the St. Louis 32 yard line. As the team scurried to line up and spike the ball, A hesitant Evans was injured on the play. With no timeouts left, Tampa Bay was forced to accept a ten-second runoff penalty, and time expired.

Week 3: at Atlanta Falcons

Atlanta throttled the Buccaneers by the score of 56–14, tied for the second-most lopsided defeat in franchise history. The Falcons jumped out to a 56–0 lead by the third quarter, including Devin Hester's NFL-record 19th return touchdown. In the first half alone, the Falcons forced three turnovers, and held Tampa Bay to 63 yards offense and only two first downs.

Week 4: at Pittsburgh Steelers

Tampa Bay won their first game of the season, as well as the first win for new head coach Lovie Smith. One week after a humiliating loss at Atlanta, the Buccaneers bounced back, and upset the Steelers, the first win in franchise history at Pittsburgh. Trailing 24–20 just inside the two-minute warning, Tampa Bay drove to the Pittsburgh 14 yard line. The Steelers forced a turnover on downs, and took over at their own 14. The Tampa Bay defense held the Steelers to a 3 and out, and forced a punt with 50 seconds left in regulation. Brad Wing's punt was high and short, and was downed inside Pittsburgh territory on the 46. Two plays later Mike Glennon, connected to Louis Murphy, who broke free for a 41-yard gain all the way to the 5 yard line. With 7 seconds left, Glennon completed the game-winning touchdown pass to Vincent Jackson in the left corner of the endzone.

Week 5: at New Orleans Saints

Mike Glennon passed for 249 yards and two touchdown passes, as the Buccaneers led the Saints 31–20 in the fourth quarter. New Orleans rallied to tie the game and force overtime. The Saints won the coin toss in overtime, and proceeded to score a touchdown on the first possession to win the game.

Week 6: vs. Baltimore Ravens

Ravens quarterback Joe Flacco threw five touchdown passes in the first 17 minutes of regulation (setting a new NFL record), as Baltimore jumped out to a 38–0 halftime lead (also an NFL record for a road team). The Ravens handed Tampa Bay their second dominating loss of the season.

Week 8: vs. Minnesota Vikings

Offensive futility plagued both teams in the first half, with Minnesota kicking a field goal as time expired in the second quarter to take a 3-0 lead into halftime. Trailing 10–6 in the fourth quarter, Mike Glennon threw a 7-yard touchdown pass to Austin Seferian-Jenkins with 2:02 remaining in regulation. The Buccaneers briefly took a 13–10 lead, but the Vikings were able to tie the game at 13–13 and force overtime.

In the overtime period, Tampa Bay won the coin toss and received. On the first play from scrimmage in overtime, Austin Seferian-Jenkins caught a 10-yard pass at the 27 yard line, but fumbled the ball as he was tackled. Anthony Barr scooped up the ball and returned it 27 yards for a touchdown, and Minnesota won 19–13.

Week 9: at Cleveland Browns

Mike Evans caught two touchdown passes from Mike Glennon, as Tampa Bay led 17–16 in the fourth quarter. Cleveland scored with 8:59 remaining in regulation, and won the game by the score of 22–17. In the final two minutes, Tampa Bay drove to the Cleveland 28 yard line, but an offensive pass interference penalty pushed them back to the 47. Facing 4th down & 11, Glennon's pass was incomplete, and the Browns defeated Tampa Bay for the first time since 1995.

Week 10: vs. Atlanta Falcons

Josh McCown returned as the starting quarterback for Tampa Bay. The Buccaneers led 17–16, but Atlanta scored a go-ahead touchdown early in the fourth quarter and held on for the win. In the final two minutes, Tampa Bay drove to the Atlanta 4 yard line, but McCown's pass to Vincent Jackson was tipped and intercepted in the endzone, sealing the game for Atlanta.

Week 11: at Washington Redskins

Mike Evans had a breakout game, catching 7 passes for 209 yards and two touchdowns (36 yards and 56 yards, respectively). Tampa Bay won their second game of the season.

Week 12: at Chicago Bears

The Buccaneers blew a 10–0 halftime lead with three turnovers in the third quarter. The Bears scored two touchdowns off of turnovers, and a total of 21 points in the third quarter to take the lead and the win. This was head coach Lovie Smith's first return to Chicago since the Bears fired him following the 2012 season.

Week 13: vs. Cincinnati Bengals

Trailing 14–13 in the closing seconds, Tampa Bay completed a 21-yard pass to the Bengals 20 yard line, but a replay showed they had 12 men on the field for the play. The penalty took the Buccaneers out of field goal range.

Week 14: at Detroit Lions

With the loss, the Buccaneers were officially eliminated from playoff contention.

Week 15: at Carolina Panthers

Like the meeting in week 1, Panthers quarterback Cam Newton was on the sidelines, this time due to injuries suffered in a car accident. Carolina swept the Buccaneers, using backup quarterbacks in both games.

Week 16: vs. Green Bay Packers

Green Bay won for the first time at Raymond James Stadium since 2003, and for only the second time ever.

Week 17: vs. New Orleans Saints

Tampa Bay took a 20-7 lead into halftime, but New Orleans rallied for the victory. Drew Brees threw a 36-yard touchdown pass to Marques Colston with 1:57 remaining. On the ensuing drive, the Saints defense sacked Josh McCown for a safety, and secured a 23–20 victory. The Saints swept Tampa Bay for the third straight season, and won their seventh overall in the rivalry. The Buccaneers, finishing 2–14, clinched the first pick in the 2015 NFL Draft.  The Bucs had also finished 0–8 at home.  Finishing winless at home for the first time since 1976 and lost their 9th straight home game.

Standings

Division

Conference

Notes

References

External links
 

Tampa Bay Buccaneers season
Tampa Bay Buccaneers
21st century in Tampa, Florida
Tampa Bay Buccaneers seasons